Sveti Vlas (also known as St. Vlas;), is a town and resort on the Black Sea coast in Nesebar municipality, Burgas Province, Bulgaria. In July, 2007 its population was 3,869.

History
The town is located at the foot of the southern slopes of the Balkan Mountains, in the northern part of Burgas Bay. A settlement was founded at the present place of Sveti Vlas in the 2nd century AD by Thracians and other Greeks, possibly Larissa (Λάρισα), though this site is more likely to be at Cape St. Athanasius. It acquired the name Sveti Vlas in the 14th century after Saint Blaise, a monastery dedicated to whom existed in the region, but was burnt down in the 14th-18th century by consecutive pirate raids. During the Ottoman rule of Bulgaria, it was known as Kücük manastir or simply Manastir ("monastery" in greek), while the name Sveti Vlas became official after 1886.

Until 1920 the population of Sveti Vlas was predominantly Greek. After 1920 as a result of the exchange of population between Greece and Bulgaria most of the local Greeks emigrated to Western Thrace (ceded to Greece in 1920) Greece and found their new home in the village of Strymi (until 1920 Chadarli), Sapes municipality. Less than 10 Greek families remained in Sveti Vlas. After 1912 and especially after 1920 tens of Bulgarian families emigrated from Greece, predominantly from Greek Macedonia and established themselves in Sveti Vlas.  
The settlement became a climatic sea resort in 1963 and a town on 2 February 2006. Sveti Vlas is the only place on the Bulgarian Black Sea coast where the beaches face directly south.

Tourism
Sveti Vlas has grown as a tourist resort in recent times, serving as a quieter alternative to nearby Sunny Beach. The gap between the two places is shrinking as more hotels and  holiday apartments are built along the coast. Sveti Vlas lies at the northern end of a bay which has Sunny Beach in its middle and the ancient town of Nesebar at its southern end. Sunny Beach and Nesebar are easily accessible by bus or taxi, and there are also boats going between Sveti Vlas and Nesebar.

The resort was mainly popular amongst inland Bulgarian tourists, but recently there is rapid growth in the number of foreign tourists, mainly from Russia, but also from Great Britain, Poland, Romania and Scandinavia. Even though Sveti Vlas was heavily developed in 2000's it remained pretty quiet and calm down place, making it good place to have a rest. Due to that fact the typical visitors in the resort are families with children.

The latest development of the area has been the building of the Dinevi marina, the largest in Bulgaria. The Dinevi brothers have been developing the area with numerous complexes, highlighted by the marina itself. The latest development being worked on is Complex Admiral, due to be completed in 2016. The beach was expanded in 2007 using rocks and sand that was removed when digging out for the marina. The marina with its clubs and restaurants has become famous among the wealthier people in Bulgaria, and expensive cars like Ferraris and Porsches can frequently be seen.

Gallery

Towns in Bulgaria
Seaside resorts in Bulgaria
Populated places in Burgas Province
Populated coastal places in Bulgaria